Charles Spurgeon Smith (August 29, 1886 – August 1, 1952) was an American football coach, college athletics administrator, and professor. He served as the head football coach at Southwest Texas State Normal School—now known as Texas State University–from 1913 to 1915, compiling a record of 11–13–2.

Smith was born on August 29, 1886, in Columbus, Texas. He graduated from Baylor University with a Bachelor of Science degree in 1910 and earned a master's degree in 1921 and doctorate in 1928 from the University of Chicago.

Smith began his teaching and coaching career in 1910 at Lockhart High School in Lockhart, Texas, where he was principal, football coach, and a science teacher. He moved to Cuero, Texas in 1912 to take a similar position with a high school there. Smith joined the faculty at Southwest Texas State in 1913 and was appointed head of the biology department around 1915. He trained as a United States Army officer in San Antonio and served as a first lieutenant in the 345th Field Artillery Regiment of the 90th Infantry Division in France during World War I.

Smith died on August 1, 1952, at a hospital in Corpus Christi, Texas.

Head coaching record

College football

References

External links
 

1886 births
1952 deaths
20th-century American educators
American school principals
Texas State Bobcats athletic directors
Texas State Bobcats baseball coaches
Texas State Bobcats men's basketball coaches
Texas State Bobcats football coaches
High school football coaches in Texas
Baylor University alumni
Texas State University faculty
University of Chicago alumni
United States Army officers
United States Army personnel of World War I
People from Columbus, Texas
Coaches of American football from Texas
Basketball coaches from Texas
Baseball coaches from Texas
Military personnel from Texas
Schoolteachers from Texas